Kendal is a civil parish in the South Lakeland District of Cumbria, England. It contains 187 listed buildings that are recorded in the National Heritage List for England. Of these, three are listed at Grade I, the highest of the three grades, twelve are at Grade II*, the middle grade, and the others are at Grade II, the lowest grade.  The parish contains the market town of Kendal, and its surroundings.  The major industries historically were wool, weaving and dyeing, and snuff is still made in the town.  The Lancaster Canal came to the town in 1819, and this created new industries, including a large shoe and boot factory.

Almost all the buildings are in local limestone with roofs of slate, also obtained locally, and most of the major buildings were designed by local architects, including Francis Webster, his son George, their partner Miles Thompson, J. F. Curwen, and Stephen Shaw.  Most of the listed buildings are houses with associated structures, shops, public houses, hotels, and offices, those in the centre of the town often having adjacent yards.  Outside the centre of the town are farmhouses and farm buildings.  Other listed buildings include churches and associated structures, a chapel, a Friends' meeting house, a well associated with an ancient spring, warehouses, a snuff works, bridges over the Lancaster Canal, which is now dry in the town, civic buildings, a pair of milestones, a bank, drinking fountains, a library, and memorials, including two war memorials.


Key

Buildings

References

Citations

Sources

Lists of listed buildings in Cumbria
Listed buildings in Kendal